The 2017 Rugby League World Cup inter-group matches were three matches played between teams in Group C and Group D of the 2017 Rugby League World Cup. Both groups C and D have only 3 teams in comparison to Group A and Group B, so in order for all teams to play 3 matches, teams across the two groups played each other.

Ireland vs Italy 

Notes:
 Due to high humidity conditions, the game was played with quarter-time drinks breaks after the heat rule was invoked.

Fiji vs Wales

Papua New Guinea vs United States

References

External links
 Official RLWC 2017 Site

2017 Rugby League World Cup